The Copa de Campeones de Juvenil is the tournament created by the RFEF to determine the overall youth champion of Spain.

Since the 2014–15 season, the winner of this competition will qualify for the UEFA Youth League.

Competition format
The winners of the seven groups of the División de Honor and the best runner-up qualify for this competition. It is played with a single-elimination tournament format.

Champions

Performance by club

See also
División de Honor Juvenil de Fútbol
Copa del Rey Juvenil de Fútbol

References

External links
RFEF site

División de Honor Juvenil de Fútbol
Juv